Herpetogramma cervinicosta is a moth in the family Crambidae. It was described by George Hampson in 1918. It is found in Colombia and Honduras.

References

Moths described in 1918
Herpetogramma
Moths of Central America
Moths of South America